Sirocalodes is a genus of beetles belonging to the family Curculionidae.

Species:
 Sirocalodes depressicollis
 Sirocalodes mixtus
 Sirocalodes nigroterminatus

References

Curculionidae
Curculionidae genera